Corinne Stoddard (born August 15, 2001) is an American short track speed skater. She represented the United States at the 2022 Winter Olympics.

Career
Stoddard competed at the 2019 Inline World Junior Championship, winning a gold medal in the 10K elimination race. During the 2019–20 season, she won a bronze medal with the relay team in Shanghai, along with Maame Biney, Kristen Santos and Julie Letai. This was the United States' first World Cup medal in the event in eight years.

She competed at the 2020 World Junior Short Track Speed Skating Championships, where she won a silver medal in the 1000 metres and a bronze medal in the 500 metres.

She represented the United States at the 2022 Winter Olympics. She suffered a broken nose during the 500 metres event.

References

2001 births
Living people
American female short track speed skaters
Four Continents Short Track Speed Skating Championships medalists
Olympic short track speed skaters of the United States
Short track speed skaters at the 2022 Winter Olympics
Sportspeople from Seattle
Competitors at the 2023 Winter World University Games
Medalists at the 2023 Winter World University Games
Universiade medalists in short track speed skating
Universiade bronze medalists for the United States